Greenwood Municipal Airport (Old) is a former airport located 2 miles southwest of Greenwood, Mississippi.  It was closed about 1970 and flight operations were moved to the Greenwood-Leflore Airport.  Today it is an industrial area.

History 
Greenwood Municipal Airport opened about 1931 as the airport for Greenwood, Mississippi. It was also known as "Leflore Airport". During World War II the Army Air Corps took over control of the airport in 1942 and three  hard-surface runways were built. The airport was used as an auxiliary landing field for the main Army Air Base across town Greenwood Army Airfield. 

After the war ended, civil control of the airport was returned to the City of Greenwood, with the airport having passenger service provided by Chicago & Southern Airlines with Lockheed Electras and later DC-3s.  In the 1950s, Delta Airlines acquired C&S and it was served by Convair 440s. 

Urban encroachment and the short runways led to the closure of the airport about 1970.  Today the site has been redeveloped into a light industrial estate.   Only one hangar and a small part of a runway remain.

See also

 Mississippi World War II Army Airfields

References 

 Abandoned Airfields: Greenwood Municipal Airport (Old)

Defunct airports in Mississippi